Steve McLaughlin is an American football player.

Steve McLaughlin may also refer to:

Steve McLaughlin, Scottish Grammy Award-winning music producer, who was member of the Scars
Steven McLaughlin (born 1963), politician
Stephen McLaughlin (born 1990), Irish football (soccer) player